Cliff Matthews (born August 5, 1989) is an American football defensive end for the Ottawa Redblacks of the Canadian Football League (CFL) . He was drafted by the Atlanta Falcons in the seventh round of the 2011 NFL Draft. He played college football at South Carolina.

Professional career

Atlanta Falcons
Matthews was selected by the Atlanta Falcons in the seventh round (230th overall) of the 2011 NFL Draft. He was signed by the team on July 28. Unfortunately, he was injured in the preseason that year. On September 4, 2015, he was released by the Falcons.

Tampa Bay Buccaneers
On February 5, 2016, he was signed to a future contract by the Tampa Bay Buccaneers. On September 3, 2016, he was released by the Buccaneers as part of final roster cuts.

Atlanta Falcons (second stint)
On October 19, 2016, Matthews was signed by the Falcons. He was released by the Falcons on December 6, 2016.

Ottawa Redblacks 
On January, 8, 2018, Matthews signed with the Ottawa Redblacks of the Canadian Football League.  Now he is the defensive line coach at Reinhardt University.

References

External links
 
 Atlanta Falcons bio
 South Carolina Gamecocks bio 

1989 births
Living people
People from Cheraw, South Carolina
Players of American football from South Carolina
American football defensive ends
South Carolina Gamecocks football players
Atlanta Falcons players
Tampa Bay Buccaneers players
Ottawa Redblacks players